Morethia butleri, also known commonly as Butler's Morethia and the woodland Morethia skink, is a species of lizard in the family Scincidae. The species is endemic to Australia.

Etymology
The specific name, butleri is in honor of Australian naturalist William Henry "Harry" Butler.

Geographic range
M. butleri is found in the Australian states of South Australia and Western Australia.

Habitat
The preferred natural habitat of M. butleri is shrubland.

Reproduction
M. butleri is oviparous.

References

Further reading
Cogger HG (2014). Reptiles and Amphibians of Australia, Seventh Edition. Clayton, Victoria, Australia: CSIRO Publishing. xxx + 1,033 pp. .
Greer AE (1974). "The generic relationships of the scincid lizard genus Leiolopisma and its relatives". Australian Journal of Zoology, Supplementary Series (31): 1–67. (Morethia butleri, new combination, p. 21).
Storr GM (1963). "Ablepharus butleri. A new scincid lizard from Australia". Australian Naturalist 9: 46–47.
Wilson, Steve; Swan, Gerry (2013). A Complete Guide to Reptiles of Australia, Fourth Edition. Sydney: New Holland Publishers. 522 pp. . 

Morethia
Reptiles described in 1963
Skinks of Australia
Endemic fauna of Australia
Taxa named by Glen Milton Storr